The Victorino Cunha Cup is an annual Angolan basketball tournament held in honour of former Angolan basketball coach Victorino Cunha. The 1st edition (2009), ran from October 16 to 23, and was contested by four teams in a round robin system. Primeiro de Agosto was the winner.

Schedule

Round 1

Round 2

Round 3

Final standings

See also
 2009 BAI Basket
 2009 Angola Basketball Cup
 2009 Angola Basketball Super Cup

References

Victorino Cunha Cup seasons
Victorino